"Day by Day" is a 1997 song by Brazilian-born Italian singer, dancer and actress Regina Saraiva. It peaked at number eight in Italy and number eleven on the US Billboard Hot Dance Music/Club Play chart. The magazine incorrectly lists "Day By Day" as a hit for American singer Regina, who last charted in 1988 and had retired from the business at the time of this single’s American release.

Charts

References

1997 singles
Regina "Queen" Saraiva songs
English-language Italian songs
Eurodance songs
1997 songs